Waramutsého! is a 2008 film.

Synopsis 
Kabera and Uwamungu are two men from Rwanda who live together in the suburbs of Toulouse. Chaos erupts in their country and Kabera finds out that members of his family have participated in the massacre of the family of his good friend, Uwamungu.

Awards 
 Festival Cinema Africano Asia America Latina de Milán 2009
 FESPACO 2009

External links 

Cameroonian short films
2008 films